Asoa, also known as Asua, Asuae, Asuati, or Aka, is a Central Sudanic language spoken by the Mbuti Pygmies known as the Asua. It is closely related to the Mangbetu language, and the Asua live in association with the Mangbetu people, among others. It is the only distinctive Pygmy language in the east.

Asua is spoken in the forests to the north of the Aruwimi River, between the Nepoko River and the headwaters of the Rubi River.

References

Central Sudanic languages
African Pygmies
Languages of the Democratic Republic of the Congo